The Autostrada A9 or Autostrada dei Laghi (“Motorway of the Lakes”) is a motorway in northern Italy. Built in 1924, it was the first motorway in Italy and in the world (competing with the AVUS of Berlin).

It connects to the A8 motorway at Lainate, near Milan, and it reaches Como, on the Lake Como, and Chiasso, on the border with Switzerland, where it connects to the Swiss road network.

It is part of the Milano - Laghi set of expressways, the oldest expressway in the world. The other Milano - Laghi expressways are A8 (connecting Milan to Varese on the Lake of Varese) and the connection between Gallarate and Sesto Calende on the Lake Maggiore (now part of the Gallarate - Gattico connection).

There is a toll section near Como.

See also
List of motorways in Italy

A09
Transport in Lombardy